The American Law and Economics Review is a biannual peer-reviewed academic journal covering law and economics. It was established in 1999 and is published by Oxford University Press on behalf of the American Law and Economics Association, of which it is the official journal. The founding editors-in-chief were Richard Posner (University of Chicago Law School) and Orley Ashenfelter (Princeton University). The current ones are J. J. Prescott and Albert Choi. According to the Journal Citation Reports, the journal has a 2020 impact factor of 0.923.

References

External links

Biannual journals
Academic journals associated with learned and professional societies of the United States
Oxford University Press academic journals
American law journals
Law and economics journals
Publications established in 1999
English-language journals
1999 establishments in the United States